Teen Beach 2 is a 2015 Disney Channel Original Movie directed by Jeffrey Hornaday. The sequel to the 2013 film Teen Beach Movie, it premiered on Disney Channel on June 26, 2015. The film was the first sequel of a Disney Channel Original Movie in five years, the last being Camp Rock 2: The Final Jam (2010).

Plot 
On the eve of the first day of school, Brady and McKenzie (Mack) celebrate the day they met and reminisce about the summer ("Best Summer Ever"), while they watch Brady's favorite movie, Wet Side Story, the 1960s musical film that they got stuck in. Mack dismisses Brady's fear that their relationship will change when they begin school. Mack then notices she lost the necklace she received while in the Wet Side Story world.

At school, Brady and Mack reunite with their respective friends, Devon and Alyssa, who are surprised by their new relationship due to their opposite personalities. Later, in class, Brady is working on surfboard designs, but hides them when Mack asks him what he is doing. Mack begins work on a "Save the Beach" dance, despite Brady's attempts to see her. Struggling with a college application, Brady works on a surfboard instead and accidentally forgets about a college fair that he was to attend with Mack, upsetting her to the point that they break up ("On My Own").

In the Wet Side Story world, Lela and Tanner suddenly break with the film's plot, having experienced changes within themselves since Mack and Brady's visit. They then notice Mack's washed-up necklace and journey into the ocean, eventually winding up in the same world as Mack and Brady, who are still not on good terms. With Lela and Tanner marveling at the wonders of the modern world ("Right Where I Wanna Be"), Mack and Brady choose to show them that the world is not as great as it seems, in hopes that they will return to their own world. Meanwhile, the characters of Wet Side Story are left confused without Lela and Tanner, with Cheechee and Seacat attempting, but failing, to substitute for the starring duo ("Falling for Ya").

Brady and Mack bring Lela and Tanner to school, where their movie characteristics come out against Mack and Brady's cautions ("Wanna Be with You", "Twist Your Frown Upside Down"). Lela becomes too enthralled with math homework to spend time with Tanner after school, and Tanner confesses to Brady that he worries he is not enough for Lela, while Brady reveals to Tanner that he and Mack are taking a break. He also shows Tanner his surfboards, and alludes that Mack might not understand his newfound hobby. Realizing that Lela and Tanner are becoming part of the modern world, Mack and Brady attempts to convince them that they are just characters from a film, showing them clips from Wet Side Story ("Silver Screen"). Upset by this, Lela throws the necklace into the ocean, prompting Mack and Brady to search for it. Meanwhile, back in the Wet Side Story world, characters begin disappearing. Butchy notices the washed-up necklace, which he uses to lead the film gang into the modern world, where they inform Lela, Tanner, Brady and Mack about the disappearing characters. Brady and Mack realize that without the main actors, the film world would cease to exist. The film characters return to their world.

Brady and Mack avoid each other during the "Save the Beach" dance, but are greeted by the characters of Wet Side Story, who decides to return to get them to reconcile ("Gotta Be Me"). When Butchy disappears with the necklace, Brady and Mack run to get Mack's grandfather's surfboard, which they first used to get into the Wet Side Story universe. With no waves, Brady decides to use a motorized surfboard he created, along with the emblem from Mack's grandfather's surfboard. Mack compares Brady's hobby to her grandfather's surfboard passion, and they agree not to keep secrets from each other ("Meant to Be").

Before Tanner and Lela leave, Mack tells Lela to make the movie her story. Brady fixes a surfboard malfunction, allowing Lela and Tanner to depart. When Brady emerges from the ocean, he and Mack appear not to know each other; they later meet at the "Save the Beach" dance, which Mack says is themed after her favorite movie, Lela, Queen of the Beach. It is revealed that Lela had followed Mack's advice and changed the movie, giving it more feminist tones but unintentionally erasing Brady and Mack's history together since the two originally met by Brady showing Mack Wet Side Story. Despite this, Mack and Brady flirt and fall in love again, restoring their relationship ("That's How We Do").

Cast 

 Ross Lynch as Brady
 Maia Mitchell as McKenzie (Mack)
 Grace Phipps as Lela
 Garrett Clayton as Tanner
 John DeLuca as Butchy
 Chrissie Fit as Cheechee
 Piper Curda as Alyssa
 Beth Lacke as Brady's mother
 Jordan Fisher as Seacat 
 Raymond Cham Jr. as Devon
 Ross Butler as Spencer
 Mollee Gray as Giggles
 Jessica Lee Keller as Struts
 William Loftis as Lugnut
 Kent Boyd as Rascal

Production 
On April 27, 2014, a sequel, Teen Beach 2, was announced as slated to premiere in 2015 on Disney Channel, with production set for July 2014 in Puerto Rico. It is the fourth Disney Channel Original Movie to be filmed in Puerto Rico, after Princess Protection Program, Wizards of Waverly Place: The Movie and Teen Beach Movie. Ross Lynch, Maia Mitchell, Grace Phipps, Garrett Clayton and John DeLuca reprise their roles in the sequel. The remaining actors who portray the bikers and surfers, Jordan Fisher, Chrissie Fit, William Loftis, Kent Boyd, Jessica Lee Keller and Mollee Gray, were also confirmed to return for the sequel. The film revolve around the characters from Wet Side Story after the first film's post-credits scene, when they were transported into the real world. Teen Beach 2 is the first Disney Channel Original Movie sequel since Camp Rock 2: The Final Jam in 2010. The Disney official site for the movie stated it will be released "Summer 2015" as Teen Beach 2. It premiered on June 26, 2015. It is one hour and 45 minutes long.

Reception 
The movie received mixed reviews from critics.  Brian Lowry of Variety wrote that while the songs were generally great and the storyline was easy to understand, "Everything else is really just the storytelling equivalent of pulling taffy, trying to create enough impediments to keep the narrative clunking along until the next spontaneous outbreak of song. Thankfully, there's a great deal of talent on the screen, though the words generally sound far better when sung than spoken." R. Thomas Umstead of Multichannel News awarded the movie 3.5 stars out of 5, writing, "Much like Teen Beach Movie, the sequel is full of impressive dance numbers, often silly dialogue and toe-tapping pop music songs that will certainly appeal to the network's target 6-to-11-year-old audience. Still, Teen Beach 2 lacks a bit of the charm exhibited in the first movie, although that will not matter much to fans of the original."

The film drew 5.8 total million viewers on its premiere night, becoming the most watched DCOM since its prequel Teen Beach Movie aired in 2013. In L+3, Teen Beach 2 delivered 7.5 million viewers and along with the weekend encore telecasts, totals 13.3 million viewers.

Soundtrack

The soundtrack album for the film was released on June 23, 2015 by Walt Disney Records.

Track listing

Charts

Awards and nominations

Notes

References

External links 

 
 

2010s musical comedy films
2010s parody films
2010s teen comedy films
2015 in American television
2015 television films
2015 films
American musical comedy films
American parody films
American sequel films
American teen comedy films
American teen musical films
Beach party films
Disney Channel Original Movie films
Musical television films
Films directed by Jeffrey Hornaday
Films set in 1962
Films shot in Puerto Rico
Television sequel films
American surfing films
2010s English-language films
2010s American films